La Habana was a baseball team in the Cuban National Series up to 2010. Representing the former La Habana Province (Provincia de La Habana), the Vaqueros won their first ever National Series in 2009, and reached the National Series final against Santiago de Cuba in 2004-05.

La Habana had three pitchers on the Cuban team at the 2006 World Baseball Classic: Yulieski González, Jonder Martínez and Yadier Pedroso.

This team disappeared in 2011, since La Habana province was divided in two new provinces Artemisa and Mayabeque with their respective baseball teams: Cazadores de Artemisa (Hunters) and Huracanes de Mayabeque (Hurricanes)

Notable players
 Luis Ignacio González
 José Ibar
 Juan Carlos Linares
 Oscar Macías
 Romelio Martínez
 Juan Carlos Millán
 Gerardo Miranda
 Andy Morales
 Manuel Morales
 José Manuel Pedroso
 Pedro Luis Rodríguez
 Mario Véliz

Baseball teams in Cuba
Baseball in Havana
San José de las Lajas
Baseball teams established in 1977
1977 establishments in Cuba
Baseball teams disestablished in 2011
2011 disestablishments in North America